The Yukon–Kuskokwim Delta is a river delta located where the Yukon and Kuskokwim rivers empty into the Bering Sea on the west coast of the U.S. state of Alaska. It is larger than the Mississippi River Delta (which varies between 32,400 and 122,000 square kilometers or 12,500 and 47,100 sq mi); it is comparable in size to the entire U.S. state of Louisiana (135,700 square kilometers or 52,400 sq mi). The delta, which consists mainly of tundra, is protected as part of the Yukon Delta National Wildlife Refuge.

The delta has approximately 25,000 residents. 85% of these are Alaska Natives: Yupik and Athabaskan people. The main population center and service hub is the city of Bethel, with an estimated population of around 6,219 (as of 2011). Bethel is surrounded by 49 smaller villages, with the largest villages consisting of over 1000 people. Most residents live a traditional subsistence lifestyle of hunting, fishing, and gathering. More than 30 percent have cash incomes well below the federal poverty threshold.

The area has virtually no roads; travel is by Bush plane, or riverboats in summer and snowmachines in winter.

Bethel is the location of the Yukon Kuskokwim Correctional Center.

References

External links
 Yukon Delta National Wildlife Refuge
 In rural Alaska villages, families struggle to survive – CNN

Landforms of the Bering Sea
Landforms of Bethel Census Area, Alaska
Landforms of Kusilvak Census Area, Alaska
Regions of Alaska
River deltas of the United States
Yukon River